Rolandiella is a genus of sea snails, marine gastropod mollusks in the family Muricidae, the murex snails or rock snails.

Species
Species within the genus Rolandiella include:

 Rolandiella scotti (Marshall & Burch, 2000)
 Rolandiella umbilicatus (Tenison-Woods, 1876)

References

Muricopsinae